Arushi Sharma (born 18 November 1995) is an Indian actress who works in Hindi films. She made her acting debut with a minor role in the film Tamasha (2015) and received recognition for her work in Love Aaj Kal (2020). Sharma has since starred in Jaadugar (2022).

Early life 
Sharma was born on 18 November 1995 in Shimla, Himachal Pradesh.  Her parents are lawyers. She graduated in Information Technology from Jai Prakash University, Bihar. She was working in Gurugram, before venturing into acting.

Career 
Sharma started her acting career in 2015 with Imtiaz Ali's Tamasha. She played Ranbir Kapoor's History Teacher and appeared as Samyukta in the song 	"Chali Kahani". It grossed ₹68.5 crore worldwide  and was a commercial failure.

She then appeared in two short films, Catorce: Diminishing Returns with Dhruv Sehgal in 2017 and The Other Way with Pavail Gulati in 2018.

Sharma appeared opposite Kartik Aaryan in Love Aaj Kal. She earned recognition with her portrayal of Leena, a small town girl who is in love with her schoolmate. The film grossed  crore and was a box-office failure. Hindustan Times mentioned, "Arushi is subtle, simple and lets her expression and face impress more than her dialogues". Times of India noted that Sharma delivers quite effectively.

In 2022, Sharma appeared in Netflix's Jaadugar opposite Jitendra Kumar. She portrayed a doctor, Disha Chabbra, whose paths crosses with a magician, who is also a footballer. Rediff.com said, "Sharma goes with the flow and empowers Meenu's unhealthiest instincts with yet another demonstration of Bollywood's dangerously docile." India Today mentioned her performance as average.

Sharma will next portray the lead in the Netflix's series, Kaalapaani.

Filmography

Films

Web series

See also 
 List of Hindi film actresses

References

External links 
 

1995 births
Living people
Indian film actresses
Actresses in Hindi cinema
21st-century Indian actresses